

The Mission 

Prishtina High School prepares students to be responsible citizens and active learners. Prishtina High School provides an American-style education in Kosovo. The school is located in the Matiqan region of Prishtina. Classes first began on 1 September 2007. They started working with only 26 students the first year. The teachers all came from the U.S. Don Tingle was the principal of the school and he was the one to work with the Ministry of Education in order to get the school licensed. At the beginning of 2010-2011 year 130 students have enrolled, including the high school and a middle school program for grades 6 to 8. Now, PHS, as an internationally accredited American-style school, offers grades 1 to 12.

Students there have to complete the following subjects: 4 years of English, Math, Science, History, Language, Physical Education, Fine Arts. In order to graduate, a student must complete a minimum of 22 credits. A 70% in each class is required to pass the course. Completing 20 hours of community service each year is required too.

In 2018, Prishtina High School joined the Network of International Christian Schools.

Credits

Grading Scale

Plagiarism and Cheating Policy 

Plagiarism shows lack of responsibility in an active learner. If a student is found to have plagiarized on any assignment, quiz, test, a zero will be given. If a student is caught plagiarizing or cheating on a major assignment, quiz, test, a total of three times during a semester, the student will receive a semester grade of “NRY” and fail the course.

Online and Dual Credit Classes 

Prishtina High School partners with MU High School through the University of Missouri to offer students access to high school and advanced courses not offered at PHS. Prishtina High School partners with Bethany College, Lindsborg Kansas, in offering two courses for dual credit: MA102 College Algebra and MA130 Analytic Geometry and Calculus 1.

RenWeb 

Prishtina High School uses RenWeb School Management Software to help students and parents know about their grades, access homework assignments and lesson plans, find the teachers' e-mails and contact them, and see photos, news, and dates from the school calendar.

Notes

References

External links 

 
 Matiqan: Kosovo
 Contact Us
 location on WikiMapia

Secondary schools in Kosovo
Buildings and structures in Pristina
Education in Pristina
Educational institutions established in 2007